Gamey'a is a form of rotating savings and credit association (ROSCAS) used in over 89 countries and communities around the world, particularly in the Middle East). It is referred to as a chit fund in India and a tanda in Mexico.

How it works:
 - Group of friends joins together to contribute a fixed monthly installment into a common pot.
 - Every month one of the users takes the whole pot as a payout.
 - Circle ends when all circle participants gets his/her payout once.
 - Circle is then usually repeated with the same group of people over again.

References

F.J.A. Bouman, Indigenous savings & credit societies in the developing world in Von Pischke, Adams & Donald (eds.) Rural Financial Markets in the Developing World World Bank, Washington, 1983
Stuart Rutherford. The Poor & Their Money Oxford University Press, Delhi, 2000
Clifford Geertz. The Rotating Credit Association: a middle rung in development. Cambridge, Massachusetts, United States: Massachusetts Institute of Technology, Center for International Studies, 1956
William J. Grant & Hugh Allen. CARE's Mata Matsu Dubara (Women on the Move) Program in Niger. Journal of Microfinance, Brigham Young School of Business, Provo, Utah, Fall, 2002.
Hugh Allen and Mark Staehle. Village Savings and Loan Associations (VSLAs) Programme Guide, Field Operations Manual. VSL Associates, Solingen, 2007.

Community building
Credit